On 29 August 2016, in Ballyjamesduff, County Cavan, Ireland, Alan Hawe (40) murdered his wife, Clodagh (39), and their three sons, Liam (13), Niall (11), and Ryan (6), before committing suicide.

Background 
Alan and Clodagh Hawe both worked in education. Alan was deputy principal at Castlerahan National School, and Clodagh was a teacher at Oristown National School.

Murders 
Alan killed his family before proceeding to hang himself. Though reports initially stated that he had stabbed his family members to death, it was later reported that he had slit the throats of his children and that Clodagh had been found face down on a sofa with "severe head and neck injuries and [with] a large pool of blood under the chair". He then wrote a "disjointed and rambling" letter in which he apologised for his actions, before taking his own life via hanging.

Aftermath 
Shortly after the murders took place, women's rights groups in Ireland (such as Women's Aid and the National Women's Council) criticized what they perceived as the overly sympathetic treatment of Alan Hawe in the Irish press.

Clodagh's sister and mother were reportedly left €50,000 in debt as a result of the legal costs of pursuing the release of document's pertinent to the investigation of the case. They were also critical of a lack of support provided by the state and by charitable organizations to their family and the families of murder victims in Ireland generally. 

The case was reviewed in 2019 following the efforts of Clodagh's family, following reports that Alan had been seen visiting the school at which he had been employed on the morning of the killings.

Also in 2019, the school in which Clodagh had been employed unveiled a new hall named in her memory.

References 

2016 in Ireland
2016 murders in the Republic of Ireland
Mass murder in Ireland